Brigadier-General Thao Ty (sometimes confused with Colonel Thao Ly, a fighter-bomber pilot of the Royal Lao Air Force) was a Laotian Paratrooper officer and commander of the Airborne Forces and the Special Forces of the Royal Lao Army (French: Armée Royale du Laos – ARL), the Land Component of the Royal Lao Armed Forces (French: Forces Armées du Royaume – FAR), the official military of the Kingdom of Laos during the 1960s and 1970s.

Career
Lt. Col. Thao Ty rose to prominence in 1963 when he replaced Brigadier general Siho Lamphouthacoul as the commander of 1st Special Mobile Group (French: Groupement Mobile Speciale 1 – GMS 1), the para-commando regiment of the Directorate of National Coordination (French:  Direction de Coordination Nationale – DCN) Security Agency. After the DNC's disbandment in February 1965, Thao Ty was transferred to the Royal Lao Army (RLA) and given command of the RLA's second airborne regiment, Mobile Group 21 (French: Groupement Mobile 21 Aeroportée – GM 21).  In 1970, he transferred again to the CIA-run guerrilla programme in Savannakhet and was posted in charge of all irregular Special Guerrilla Units (SGU) forces in the Military Region 3. During the following year he was promoted to Brigadier general after its participation in retaking the town of Paksong in December 1972.  He then transferred back to the regular Army in order to head both the newly formed 2nd Strike Division (French: 2éme Division d'Intervention) and the new elite Special Commando Company (French: Compagnie Commando Speciale – CCS) or SPECOM for short.

Death
In May 1975 Brig. Gen. Thao Ty was quickly arrested and executed by the Pathet Lao.

See also
Brigadier general Thao Ma
Colonel Bounleuth Saycocie
Directorate of National Coordination
Laotian Civil War
Major general Ouane Rattikone
Major general Phoumi Nosavan
SPECOM
Royal Lao Armed Forces
Royal Lao Army
Royal Lao Army Airborne
Royal Lao Police

Notes

References
Kenneth Conboy and Don Greer, War in Laos 1954–1975, Carrollton, TX: Squadron/Signal Publications, 1994. 
Kenneth Conboy and Simon McCouaig, The War in Laos 1960-75, Men-at-arms series 217, Osprey Publishing Ltd, London 1989. 
Kenneth Conboy and Simon McCouaig, South-East Asian Special Forces, Elite series 33, Osprey Publishing Ltd, London 1991. 

Year of birth missing
Laotian military leaders
Year of death missing
Laotian anti-communists
Executed military leaders
People of the Laotian Civil War